Uladzimir Izotau (born 6 September 1988) is a Belarusian para swimmer who specialises in the breaststroke. At the Rio 2016 Paralympic Games, he won the gold medal in the men’s 100m breaststroke SB12 final. The games were commemorated on postage stamps all over the world. Izotau represented Belarus.

References

1988 births
Living people
Belarusian male swimmers
Paralympic swimmers of Belarus
Paralympic gold medalists for Belarus
Paralympic silver medalists for Belarus
Paralympic bronze medalists for Belarus
Swimmers at the 2008 Summer Paralympics
Swimmers at the 2012 Summer Paralympics
Swimmers at the 2016 Summer Paralympics
Medalists at the 2008 Summer Paralympics
Medalists at the 2012 Summer Paralympics
Medalists at the 2016 Summer Paralympics
Medalists at the World Para Swimming Championships
Medalists at the World Para Swimming European Championships
Paralympic medalists in swimming
S12-classified Paralympic swimmers